John Hiley Addington (August 1759 – 11 June 1818) was a British Tory party politician. He served as a Member of Parliament for various constituencies between 1787 and 1818.

Background and education
Addington was the second son of Anthony Addington and his wife Mary, daughter of Haviland John Hiley. His older brother was Henry Addington, who served as Prime Minister of the United Kingdom and under whose lifelong influence and patronisation he was. He was educated at Cheam School and then at Winchester College. Addington studied in Ealing until 1776 and afterwards at Brasenose College, Oxford.

Political career
Addington entered the British House of Commons in 1787, having been elected for Truro. He represented the constituency until 1790 and after a break of four years was returned to Parliament for Winchelsea until 1796. In the following general election Addington stood successfully for Wendover. He held that seat until the Act of Union 1801 and then became a member of the newly established Parliament of the United Kingdom. In 1802 Addington won the election for Bossiney, however he resigned his seat the following year. Instead he ran for Harwich in a by-election, which had been triggered by the death of his predecessor. Addington sat for the constituency for the rest of his life.

During his time as Member of Parliament, he was appointed a Lord of the Treasury in December 1800, by the then Prime Minister William Pitt. In March of the following year he became a Secretary to the Treasury until 1802, when on his own request he returned to his former office. Addington was made Paymaster of the Forces in 1803 and on this occasion was sworn of the Privy Council. When in the next year his brother Henry's government failed, he was replaced as Paymaster. In 1806, Addington joined the Board of Control as a commissioner, however left it after a year. He accepted an appointment as Under-Secretary of State for Home Affairs in 1812, retiring after a collapse in 1818.

In 1803 Addington was nominated High Steward of Harwich and lieutenant-colonel of the Mendip Volunteers.

Family and death
In 1785, Addington married Mary, daughter of Henry Unwin. The couple had two sons and a daughter. Addington died at Longford Court in 1818 from complications after an operation on his stomach. He was survived by his wife until 1833. His younger son Henry was a diplomat and civil servant.

The writer Hannah More was a close friend of Addington and his family.

Notes

References

External links

 

1759 births
1818 deaths
Alumni of Brasenose College, Oxford
British MPs 1784–1790
British MPs 1790–1796
British MPs 1796–1800
Members of the Parliament of Great Britain for English constituencies
Members of the Privy Council of the United Kingdom
Members of the Parliament of the United Kingdom for English constituencies
People educated at Cheam School
People educated at Winchester College
Tory MPs (pre-1834)
UK MPs 1801–1802
UK MPs 1802–1806
UK MPs 1806–1807
UK MPs 1807–1812
UK MPs 1812–1818